"Amare" is a 1979 hit Italian popular song by Mino Vergnaghi written by Sergio Ortone, Piero Soffici, and Pietro Finà. The song won first prize at the Sanremo Music Festival 1979. The single was released on Ri-Fi, and Italian label founded in 1959 by Giovanni Ansoldi. The B-side was "Grida".

References

1979 singles
1979 songs
Sanremo Music Festival songs